was a Crown Prince of the Ryūkyū Kingdom, the eldest son of King Shō Boku.

He died in 1788 before being able to succeed to the throne of the kingdom, and was entombed in the royal mausoleum of Tamaudun. King Shō On and King Shō Kō both are his sons.

References

1759 births
1788 deaths
Second Shō dynasty
Princes of Ryūkyū
Heirs apparent who never acceded